Seal Island is a 1948 American documentary film directed by James Algar. Produced by Walt Disney, it was the first installment of the True-Life Adventures series of nature documentaries. It won an Oscar in 1949 for Best Short Subject (Two-Reel).

Cast
 Winston Hibler as Narrator

Production
In 1947, Walt Disney contracted with Alfred and Elma Milotte to shoot documentary footage of the wildlife and culture of Alaska. Disney did not see the theatrical value in the footage of human activity in Alaska, but he was intrigued with footage that the Milottes shot of the seal population at the Pribilof Islands. Disney himself coined the title Seal Island for the film, and planned it as the first in a new series of nature documentaries called True-Life Adventures.

The Milottes shot more than 100,000 feet of film and spent over a year filming the seals. The total production cost Disney a little over $100,000.

Release
RKO Pictures, the studio distributing Disney's films at the time, initially refused to release the half-hour Seal Island. Disney booked the film for its Los Angeles and New York theatrical engagements, and RKO agreed to release the film nationally only after it proved its commercial potential and received the Academy Award.

As of January 6, 2022, the short had not yet been added to Disney's streaming platform Disney+ in the United States, although many other True-Life Adventures shorts are hosted there.

References

External links

1940s English-language films
1948 documentary films
1948 short films
1940s short documentary films
American short documentary films
American black-and-white films
Black-and-white documentary films
RKO Pictures short films
Disney documentary films
Disney short films
Documentary films about nature
Films set in Alaska
Films shot in Alaska
Films about pinnipeds
Films scored by Oliver Wallace
Films directed by James Algar
Films produced by Walt Disney
Live Action Short Film Academy Award winners
Pribilof Islands
Documentary films about Alaska
1940s American films